Driven is a 1923 American silent romance film produced and distributed by Universal Pictures. The director of the film was Charles Brabin. This film appears to be lost. The film was adapted from "The Flower of the Flock", a short story by Jay Gelzer.

Cast
Emily Fitzroy - Mrs. Tolliver
Burr McIntosh - Mr. Tolliver
Charles Emmett Mack - Tom Tolliver
George Bancroft - Lem Tolliver
Fred Koser - Tolliver Son
Ernest Chandler - Tolliver Son
Leslie Stowe - John Hardin
Elinor Fair - Essie Hardin

References

External links

1923 films
American silent feature films
Films directed by Charles Brabin
Lost American films
1923 romantic drama films
American romantic drama films
American black-and-white films
Universal Pictures films
1923 lost films
1920s American films
Silent romantic drama films
Silent American drama films